Sardar Mir Sarfraz Chakar Domki is a Pakistani politician who is the current Provincial Minister of Balochistan for Services and General Administration, in office since 8 September 2018. He has been a member of the Provincial Assembly of Balochistan since August 2018. Previously he served as Provincial Minister of Balochistan for Culture, Archives and Tourism, from 30 August 2018 to 8 September 2018. 

He was a Member of the Provincial Assembly of Balochistan from May 2013 to May 2018.

Early life and education
He was born on 12 August 1969 in Lehri District.

He has a degree in Bachelor of Arts.

Political career
He served as assistant commissioner and additional deputy commissioner in the Government of Balochistan between 1988 and 2010.

He was elected to the Provincial Assembly of Balochistan as a candidate of Pakistan Muslim League (N) from Constituency PB-21 Sibi in 2013 Pakistani general election.

He was re-elected to the Provincial Assembly of Balochistan as a candidate Balochistan Awami Party (BAP) from Constituency PB-7 (Sibbi-cum-Lehri) in 2018 Pakistani general election.

On 27 August 2018, he was inducted into the provincial Balochistan cabinet of Chief Minister of Jam Kamal Khan. On 30 August, he was appointed as Provincial Minister of Balochistan for Culture, Archives and Tourism. On 8 September 2018, he was redesignated as Provincial Minister of Balochistan for Labour and Manpower.

References

Living people
Balochistan MPAs 2013–2018
1969 births
Pakistan Muslim League (N) politicians
Balochistan Awami Party MPAs (Balochistan)
Provincial ministers of Balochistan